Vișeu de Jos (or Unter-Visheve) is a commune in  Maramureș County, Maramureș, Romania. It is composed of a single village, Vișeu de Jos. The river Vișeu, a tributary of the Tisa, flows through this commune.

The Vișeu de Jos train station serves the CFR Line 409, which runs from Salva in Bistrița-Năsăud County to Sighetu Marmației.

Natives
 Gheorghe Bodo

References

External links

Communes in Maramureș County
Localities in Romanian Maramureș